Cansaulim railway station (station code: CSM) is a small railway station in South Goa district, Goa. It serves Cansaulim village. The station consists of one platform. The platform is not well sheltered. It lacks many facilities including water and sanitation.

Major trains 

 Vasco da Gama–Kulem Passenger

References

Hubli railway division
Railway stations in South Goa district